Spulerina quadrifasciata is a moth of the family Gracillariidae. It is known from Nigeria.

References

Endemic fauna of Nigeria
Spulerina
Insects of West Africa
Moths of Africa
Moths described in 1980